Paulo Gonçalves may refer to:

Paulo Gonçalves (football manager) (born 1936), Brazilian football manager
Paulo Gonçalves (motorcyclist) (1979–2020), Portuguese rally racing motorcycle rider